The fourth season of the American serial drama television series Lost commenced airing on the ABC network in the United States, and on CTV in Canada on January 31, 2008, and concluded on May 29, 2008.  The season continues the stories of a group of over 40 people who have been stranded on a remote island in the South Pacific, after their airplane crashed there more than 90 days prior to the beginning of the season. According to Lost executive producers/writers/showrunners Damon Lindelof and Carlton Cuse, there are two main themes in the fourth season: "the castaways' relationship to the freighter folk" and "who gets off the island and the fact that they need to get back". The fourth season was acclaimed for its flash-forwards, pace and new characters.

The season was originally planned to contain 16 episodes; eight were written before the start of the 2007–08 Writers Guild of America strike. Following the strike's resolution, it was announced that only five more episodes would be produced to complete the season; however, the season finale's script was so long that network executives approved the production of a 14th episode as part of a three-hour season finale split over two nights. The fourth season aired Thursdays at 9:00 pm from January 31 to March 20, 2008, and at 10:00 pm from April 24 to May 15, 2008. The two-hour finale aired at 9:00 pm on May 29, 2008. Buena Vista Home Entertainment released the season on DVD and Blu-ray Disc under the title Lost: The Complete Fourth Season – The Expanded Experience on December 9, 2008, in Region 1; however, it was released earlier—on October 20, 2008—in Region 2.

Crew 
The fourth season was produced by ABC Studios, Bad Robot Productions and Grass Skirt Productions.  Damon Lindelof and Carlton Cuse served as the season's show runners.  The show was primarily filmed in Hawaii with post-production in Los Angeles. Lindelof and Cuse's fellow executive producers were co-creator J. J. Abrams, Bryan Burk and Jack Bender.  The staff writers were Lindelof, Cuse, co-executive producers Edward Kitsis, Adam Horowitz, and Drew Goddard, supervising producer Elizabeth Sarnoff, co-producer Brian K. Vaughan and executive story editor Christina M. Kim. The regular directors were Bender and co-executive producer Stephen Williams.

Cast 
The fourth season featured 16 major roles with star billing.  The show continues to chronicle the lives of the survivors of the crash of Oceanic Airlines Flight 815, including their interactions with the island's original inhabitants, whom they refer to as "the Others", and an inauspicious team from a nearby freighter. Characters are briefly summarized and credited in alphabetical order.

 Naveen Andrews acts as 815 survivor Sayid Jarrah, a former soldier of the Iraqi Republican Guard.
 Henry Ian Cusick plays Desmond Hume, a man who has been living on the island for three years and who has developed the ability to time travel, though this is beyond his control. 
 Jeremy Davies plays Daniel Faraday, a socially awkward physicist from the freighter. 
 Emilie de Ravin portrays single new mother Claire Littleton of Flight 815.  
 Michael Emerson acts as Ben Linus, the leader of the Others.      
 Matthew Fox stars as Dr. Jack Shephard, the leader of the castaways.  
 Jorge Garcia plays unlucky millionaire and mentally unstable Hugo "Hurley" Reyes, one of Jack's fellow survivors of 815.  
 Josh Holloway portrays the sardonic 815 survivor James "Sawyer" Ford.
 Daniel Dae Kim plays the non-English speaking Jin Kwon 
 Yunjin Kim plays Jin's pregnant wife Sun.  
 Ken Leung portrays Miles Straume, an arrogant medium from the freighter.  
 Evangeline Lilly stars as fugitive Kate Austen.
 Rebecca Mader acts as anthropologist Charlotte Lewis from the freighter.  
 Elizabeth Mitchell portrays fertility specialist Juliet Burke, a woman recruited by the Others who joins the 815 survivors in the third season and becomes involved in a love square with Jack, Kate and Sawyer.
 Dominic Monaghan as Charlie Pace. Monaghan only received star billing in the episode in which he appeared.
 Terry O'Quinn plays John Locke, an 815 survivor with a deep connection to the island.  
 Harold Perrineau acts as Flight 815 survivor Michael Dawson, who returns aboard the freighter undercover for Ben as a deckhand, after escaping the island in Season 2.

The show regularly features guest stars.  Jeff Fahey plays the freighter's helicopter pilot Frank Lapidus, while Kevin Durand acts as Martin Keamy, the sinister leader of a group of mercenaries from the freighter that included Anthony Azizi's character Omar. L. Scott Caldwell and Sam Anderson return as 815 married couple Rose Henderson and Bernard Nadler.  John Terry appears as Jack and Claire's deceased father Christian Shephard.  Marsha Thomason returns as Naomi Dorrit, the first person from the freighter to appear on the island and Marc Vann plays Ray, the ship's doctor.  Alan Dale acts as Charles Widmore, the man responsible for sending the freighter to the island.  Mira Furlan portrays Danielle Rousseau, a marooned island inhabitant of sixteen years, who is reunited with her sixteen-year-old daughter, Alex, played by Tania Raymonde; Blake Bashoff plays Alex's boyfriend Karl.  Nestor Carbonell is Richard Alpert, the ranking Other while Ben is held in captivity. Grant Bowler acts as Gault, the captain of the freighter, Kahana. Fisher Stevens and Zoë Bell play George Minkowski and Regina, two crew members involved with communications.  Lance Reddick's character Matthew Abaddon is introduced as a mysterious man with connections to Naomi, Hurley and Locke.

Former regular cast members return for guest spots.  Malcolm David Kelley reprises the role of Walt Lloyd, Michael's son, in both flashbacks and flashforwards. Cynthia Watros appear in a hallucination as deceased survivor Libby.

Reception

Critical reception 

On Rotten Tomatoes, the season has an approval rating of 88% with an average score of 8.6 out of 10 based on 25 reviews. The website's critical consensus reads, "Lost regains its mojo in a fourth season that reaffirms the show's place as one of TV's most unique undertakings."

Time named Lost the seventh best television series of 2008 and praised the fourth season for "complicat[ing] [Lost] time-and-space-travel story deliciously". Don Williams of BuddyTV dubbed "The Beginning of the End" "the most anticipated season premiere of the year" and Michael Ausiello later called the final hour of Lost fourth season "the most anticipated 60 minutes of television all year."  American critics were sent screener DVDs of "The Beginning of the End" and "Confirmed Dead" on January 28, 2008.  Metacritic gave the season a Metascore—a weighted average based on the impressions of a select twelve critical reviews—of 87, earning the second highest Metascore in the 2007–2008 television season after the fifth and final season of HBO's The Wire.  In a survey conducted by TVWeek of professional critics, Lost was voted the best show on television in the first half of 2008 "by a wide margin", apparently "crack[ing] the top five on nearly every critic's submission" and receiving "nothing but praise".  The May 7, 2007 announcement of a 2010 series end date and the introduction of flashforwards were received favorably by critics, as were the season's new characters.

Awards and nominations 

The fourth season was nominated for seven Primetime Emmy Awards, with one win, for Outstanding Sound Mixing for a Comedy or Drama Series (One-Hour). The series was nominated for Outstanding Drama Series, its second nomination in that category since the first season, while Michael Emerson received his second consecutive nomination for Outstanding Supporting Actor in a Drama Series. It also received nominations for Outstanding Cinematography for a One-Hour Series, Outstanding Music Composition for a Series (Original Dramatic Score), Outstanding Single-Camera Picture Editing for a Drama Series, and Outstanding Sound Editing for a Series.

The season earned Lost two Television Critics Association Award nominations for "Program of the Year" and "Outstanding Achievement in Drama". The season also was nominated for a 2008 Writers Guild of America Award in the category of Dramatic Series.

Ratings 
Throughout the fourth season, Lost continued to slip in the ratings.  The season premiered with 16 million American viewers, giving Lost its highest ratings in 17 episodes; however, the size of the audience steadily decreased throughout the season. The eighth episode, which served as the mid-season finale as a result of the writers' strike, brought in 11 million, setting a new series low.  The next episode and midseason premiere climbed slightly to 12 million, but the episode after that set the current record for lowest-rated episode in the United States with 11 million people watching. The finale was seen by 12 million, reaching the most viewers since the midseason premiere and making it Lost lowest-rated finale yet.  Despite the decline in viewers, Lost consistently ranked within the top 20 programs of the week with one exception.  The finale topped the chart, due to its broadcast being over a week after the official end of the television season. Entertainment president Stephen McPherson commented that while he would "love to see the show grow … the reality is that the numbers are pretty good."

Episodes 

The number in the "No. overall" column refers to the episode's number within the overall series, whereas the number in the "No. in season" column refers to the episode's number within this particular season. "Featured character(s)" refers to the character(s) who is centered on in the episode's flashbacks or flashforwards.  "U.S. viewers (million)" refers to the number of Americans in millions who watched the episode as it was aired.  A clip-show recapping the first three seasons titled "Lost: Past, Present & Future" preceded the season premiere episode.

Home media

References

External links 

List of Lost season 4 episodes at Lostpedia

Lost (TV series)
2008 American television seasons